Antiplanes dendritoplicata is a species of sea snail, a marine gastropod mollusk in the family Pseudomelatomidae.

Description
The length of the shell attains 35 mm.

Distribution
This marine species occurs off the Kurile Islands, Russia

References

 Kantor, Yu I., and A. V. Sysoev. "Mollusks of the genus Antiplanes (Gastropoda: Turridae) of the northwestern Pacific Ocean." The Nautilus 105.4 (1991): 119–146.
 Hasegawa K. (2009) Upper bathyal gastropods of the Pacific coast of northern Honshu, Japan, chiefly collected by R/V Wakataka-maru. In: T. Fujita (ed.), Deep-sea fauna and pollutants off Pacific coast of northern Japan. National Museum of Nature and Science Monographs 39: 225-383

External links
 

dendritoplicata
Gastropods described in 1991